A rattail is a hair style that is characterized by a long "tail"-like element of hair growing downward from the back of the head. The rattail usually hangs naturally; however, it can be braided, treated as a dread, permed, straightened, poofed, or curled with an iron. In some instances, an individual might choose to grow several tails as opposed to a single very long tail. A rattail is characterised by hair longer than the rest of the hair surrounding it.

The rattail saw a brief period of mainstream popularity during the mid to late 1980s. By the mid 90s it had rapidly fallen out of fashion. However, it has recently seen renewed popularity.

Cultural prevalence
Some punks and rivetheads have been known to sport rattails, although in a much more punk fashion, sometimes with the tail dyed a different color than the rest of the hair or by shaving the rest of the head, leaving only the tail. It is a very popular hairstyle in Broome, Western Australia and New Zealand, especially among  boys, and is sometimes combined with shaved sides as a soft fauxhawk.

New Kids On The Block performer Jordan Knight wore a long braided rattail for much of his time with the band, which helped further the style's popularity.

Former junior welterweight boxing champion Kostya Tszyu sported a rather famous rattail throughout his career.

Game developer Richard Garriott has worn a rattail since 1984.

In the Star Wars universe, Jedi Padawans wear a rattail called a Padawan Braid until they are given the rank of Jedi Knight.

In the "Cool Guy Clarence" episode of Clarence, Clarence gets a rattail after admiring the one his new friend has.

See also
 List of hairstyles
 Mullet
 Pigtail
 Ponytail
 Queue
 Sikha

References

External links
 
 

Scalp hairstyles
1980s fashion
1990s fashion